Zefyri railway station is a station on the Athens Airport-Patras railway line in Zefyri, a suburb in the north-central part of Athens, Greece. Located inside a tunnel on the islet of Attiki Odos,
The station opened on 10 May 2018 and is served by the Athens Suburban Railway.

History
The station, whose operation started at 5:49 AM on 10 May 2018, after a long delay was constructed by ERGOSE within the existing cutting, as the line open several years prior. Built using the cut & cover metherd, it was an independent technical object of the project: Zefyriou "(Α.Σ. 541/13).

Facilities
The station has a ticket office. At platform level, seating and information boards are available, with access to the platforms via life or escalator. There is a bus stop outside the station where the local 735 calls.

Services

Since 15 May 2022, the following weekday services call at this station:

Athens Metro Line 2 will call at this station in the future according to the October 2022 metro expansion plan.

Station layout

See also
Railway stations in Greece
Hellenic Railways Organization
Hellenic Train
Proastiakos

References

West Athens (regional unit)
Buildings and structures in West Attica
Transport in West Attica
Fyli
Railway stations in Attica
Railway stations opened in 2018